The simple station Zona Industrial is part of the TransMilenio mass-transit system of Bogotá, Colombia, which opened in the year 2000.

Location

The station is located near downtown Bogotá, specifically on Calle 13 between Carreras 38 and 42.

It serves the Zona Industrial, Estación Central (Central Station), and San Andresito.

History

The station was opened in 2003 after completion of the Calle 13 portion of the Américas line, from De La Sabana to Puente Aranda.

On February 4, 2011, following a review by the DIAN in the premises of San Andresito of Cr 38, sector traders began a violent protest in which the station was stoned Zona Industrial next to a bus system, causing damage worth 100 million pesos.

Station services

Old trunk services

Main line service

Feeder routes

This station does not have connections to feeder routes.

Inter-city service

This station does not have inter-city service.

External links
TransMilenio

See also
Bogotá
TransMilenio
List of TransMilenio Stations

TransMilenio